The Beautiful Mistake is a rock band from San Diego, California. Formed in 2000, the band has released two full-length albums: the 2002 debut album, Light A Match, For I Deserve To Burn, and 2004's This Is Who You Are. They have also released four EPs and had various songs featured on different compilation albums.

Formed by Josh Hagquist and Shawn Grover following the breakup of their previous band, Ember, the band went through numerous member changes throughout the 2000's with Hagquist (vocals–guitar) remaining the constant in each incarnation. The Beautiful Mistake released albums on SideCho Records, The Militia Group and Reignition Records and had songs and videos featured on releases by Victory Records and Hopeless Records. The band also had their two full-length albums re-released in Europe on Sorepoint/Eat Sleep Records and in Asia on Bigmouth Japan. The Beautiful Mistake toured with numerous hardcore, punk and rock bands including Further Seems Forever, Brand New, Hopesfall, Elliott, Funeral For A Friend, As Cities Burn, Fall Out Boy, Senses Fail, Moneen, Every Time I Die, Open Hand, Glasseater, Brandtson, Anberlin, The Myriad, Copeland, and Emery to name a few. They were also able to share the stage with bands like Snapcase, Shelter, Common Rider, Underoath, Atreyu, Avenged Sevenfold, and Boysetsfire during their extensive touring of the U.S. They also made repeated appearances at CMJ fest in New York and SXSW in Austin Texas. They had songs featured on numerous television shows on Mtv, Vh1 and the WB network. In 2005 The Beautiful Mistake were included in the movie "Bastards of Young" released on Art & Industry Films. The movie showcased the growing post-hardcore DIY music scene and also included interviews and performances from Taking Back Sunday, Thursday, Midtown, Jimmy Eat World, and Armor For Sleep. Interviews were taped at the annual Surf & Skate Festival in New Jersey in 2004. The Beautiful Mistake stopped touring in late 2005.

In the Summer of 2008 Josh, Shawn and Armin Tchami reunited for an acoustic set at Tomfest and played songs from every release.

Since 2006, Hagquist has played bass guitar in The Lassie Foundation, from Los Angeles. Josh also plays guitar in The Stranger Kings from Orange County, California, and is currently recording his own music under the name Saint Valletta with Josh Quesada on drums. 
Shawn Grover was in a band from Eugene, Oregon called Moher. Josh Quesada plays in a band from Longmont, Co called Francis and the Wolf. He also produces and records artist out of his studio in Colorado. Jon Berndtson played guitar in Cue the Doves and performed vocals in two bands, Get Young and Years Spent, all from Minneapolis, Minnesota.

The Beautiful Mistake (Josh Hagquist, Shawn Grover, Jon Berndtson, Josh Quesada) played two reunion shows in Southern California in late March of 2018. This was the first time since 2004 that all of them had played together. The first show was at the Chain Reaction in Anaheim, and the second was at Brick By Brick in San Diego. 

in 2018 The Beautiful Mistake started working on new songs. Included in the line-up was original guitar player, Steve Dunlap. These sessions turned out the music for their EP, "You're Not Broken, I Am."

In May 2019 The Beautiful Mistake recorded a yet unnamed 5 song EP with Beau Burchell in Temecula, California.

January 2020 The Beautiful Mistake announced their new EP "You're Not Broken, I Am" will be released on Wire Tap Records in the US, and Disconnect Disconnect Records in the UK/EU. The first single "Memento Mori" was released on January 27 exclusively on Kerrang!

In September of 2021 The Beautiful Mistake played Furnace Fest in Birmingham, Alabama. Their set included songs from "Light A Match...", "This Is Who You Are", and their newest EP "You're Not Broken. I Am."

Discography
 December EP (2001) - Republica Records
The original "December EP" was recorded in 2001 at Love Juice Labs in Riverside, Ca. The four tracks were recorded in two days, and the EP was pressed onto CD and sold locally at shows and through independent record stores. This CD, and their live show was what garnered them interest from numerous record labels.

 The Beautiful Mistake (EP) (2002) - SideCho Records
This was supposed to be a re-recorded version of the original "December EP". The recording was done over a period of 5 weeks in Long Beach, California. Despite being initially happy with the pre-mixed versions of the songs, the final mixing was done without input from the band. The quality was sub-par, and many of the tracks that were kept were "scratch tracks".  It was released despite strong objections from the members of The Beautiful Mistake. 

 Light a Match, For I Deserve to Burn (2002) - The Militia Group
Recorded in Eudora, Kansas at the Red House Studios in the early part of 2002. Recorded, Produced, and Mixed by Ed Rose. The recording took two weeks, and was mastered by Gavin Lurrsen @ The Mastering Lab. 

 The Beautiful Mistake (EP) Re-recording (2003) - SideCho Records
This re-recorded version (of the original four songs on the "December EP" plus "Disclosure") was recorded @ Jumbosound Studios in El Cajon, California. Produced and mixed by Sean O'Donnell. The songs were re-worked, with new instrumentation and arrangements. It was done in an attempt to "right the wrongs" of what happened with the first recording in 2002.  Layout by Brady Clark.

 This Is Who You Are (2004) - The Militia Group
Recorded in December 2003 @ Harddrive Studios in Hollywood, California, and @ Skyline Studios in Berkeley, California. Produced and Mixed by Michael Rosen and Tone. The record was mixed @ J Street Recorders in Sacramento, California. Layout and graphic work by Jason Oda of Starving Eyes.

 The Beautiful Mistake & Ettison Clio (Split EP) (2006) - Reignition Records
Recorded in the Spring of 2005 @ Jumbosound Studios in San Diego, California. Recorded and Produced by Sean O'Donnell. This was the first recording of new material since they released "This Is Who You Are" in 2004. Original cover art by Derek Hess.

Derek Hess created the original piece of artwork for the cover of The Beautiful Mistake / Ettison Clio Split EP on Reignition Records. (Released in 2006)

 You're Not Broken, I Am (March 2020) - Wire Tap Records (US) / Disconnect Disconnect Records (UK/EU)
Recorded in the Spring of 2019 @ The Cottage in Temecula, California. Recorded and Produced by Beau Burchell. Mastered by Mike Kalajian. This was the first new music from the band since 2006. Layout by Kamtin Mohager. Photos in layout and on cover by Josh Hagquist.

The album This Is Who You Are peaked at No. 49 on the Billboard Top Heatseekers chart, and No. 22 on the Billboard Top Independent chart.

References

External links
The Beautiful Mistake on MySpace
Interview of The Beautiful Mistake on TruePunk.com
The Beautiful Mistake on Facebook

Musical groups from San Diego
Musical groups established in 2000
Musical groups disestablished in 2006
American post-hardcore musical groups